The All-Ireland Senior Hurling Championship of 1963 was the 77th staging of Ireland's premier hurling knock-out competition.  Kilkenny won the championship, beating Waterford 4-17 to 6-8 in the final at Croke Park, Dublin.

The championship

Format

Munster Championship

First round: (2 matches) These are two matches between the first four teams drawn from the province of Munster.  Two teams are eliminated at this stage while the two winners advance to the semi-finals.

Semi-finals: (2 matches) The winners of the two first round games join the other two Munster teams to make up the semi-final pairings.  Two teams are eliminated at this stage while the winners advance to the final.

Final: (1 match) The winner of the two semi-finals contest this game.  One team is eliminated at this stage while the winners advance to the All-Ireland final.

Leinster Championship

First round: (1 match) This is a single match between the first two teams drawn from the province of Leinster.  One team is eliminated at this stage while the winners advance to the semi-finals.

Semi-finals: (2 matches) The winner of the first round joins the other three Leinster teams to make up the semi-final pairings.  Two teams are eliminated at this stage while the winners advance to the final.

Final: (1 match) The winner of the two semi-finals contest this game.  One team is eliminated at this stage while the winners advance to the All-Ireland final.

All-Ireland Championship

Final: (1 match) The champions of Munster and Leinster contest this game.

Results

Leinster Senior Hurling Championship

Munster Senior Hurling Championship

All-Ireland Senior Hurling Championship

Championship statistics

Miscellaneous

 Waterford's Munster final victory was their last until 2002.
 The All-Ireland final was Waterford's ninth time playing at Croke Park.  It would be 1998 before the team returned to the stadium for an All-Ireland semi-final against Kilkenny.  It would be 2008 before Waterford played in another All-Ireland final where, once again, the opposition turned out to be Kilkenny.

Top scorers

Season

Single game

References

 Corry, Eoghan, The GAA Book of Lists (Hodder Headline Ireland, 2005).
 Donegan, Des, The Complete Handbook of Gaelic Games (DBA Publications Limited, 2005).

See also

1963
All-Ireland Senior Hurling Championship